Elections were held in the Australian state of Queensland on 12 November 1977 to elect the 82 members of the state's Legislative Assembly.

The election resulted in a fourth consecutive victory for the National-Liberal Coalition under Joh Bjelke-Petersen. It was the eighth victory of the National Party in Queensland since it first came to office in 1957.

Issues

The major issue in the election was law and order. In 1977, the Government had passed a law making it illegal to march in the street without a permit, which were rarely given. The Coalition argued that this prevented traffic disruption and other inconveniences to the people of Brisbane, while the ALP claimed that it was a curtailment of civil liberties. Joh Bjelke-Petersen also no longer had the Whitlam Labor Government (which was unpopular in Queensland) to use as a campaigning tool.

Key dates

Result

The Labor Party gained twelve seats from the Coalition and Independents, making something of a recovery from its disastrous 1974 performance. Even so, the Coalition retained a commanding majority in the Legislative Assembly.

For the first time, the National Party won more votes than the Liberal party (an electoral malapportionment had allowed the Nationals to win more seats than the Liberals previously). The Liberal Party had begun to decline.

The Democratic Labor Party had ceased to exist. The Australian Democrats contested their first election in Queensland.

Results

|}

New parties in this election were the Australian Democrats, who stood 12 candidates, and the Progress Party, who stood 27 candidates.

Seats changing hands 

 Members listed in italics did not recontest their seats.
 In addition, the Independent member for Mackay, Ed Casey re-joined the Labor party before the election and retained the seat.

Post-election pendulum

See also
 Candidates of the Queensland state election, 1977
 Members of the Queensland Legislative Assembly, 1974–1977
 Members of the Queensland Legislative Assembly, 1977–1980

References

Elections in Queensland
1977 elections in Australia
1970s in Queensland
November 1977 events in Australia